Laurentius Fabritius (1535 – 22 Jul 1600) was a Roman Catholic prelate who served as Auxiliary Bishop of Cologne (1588–1600) and Titular Bishop of Cyrene.

Biography
Laurentius Fabritius was born in Uerdingen, Germany in 1535. On 23 Mar 1588, he was appointed during the papacy of Pope Sixtus V as Auxiliary Bishop of Cologne and Titular Bishop of Cyrene. On 7 Aug 1588, he was consecrated bishop by Ottavio Mirto Frangipani, Bishop of Caiazzo. He served as Auxiliary Bishop of Cologne until his death on 22 Jul 1600. While bishop, he was the principal consecrator of Dietrich von Furstenberg, Bishop of Paderborn (1589).

References

External links and additional sources
 (for Chronology of Bishops) 
 (for Chronology of Bishops)  
 (for Chronology of Bishops) 
 (for Chronology of Bishops)  

16th-century German Roman Catholic bishops
Bishops appointed by Pope Sixtus V
1535 births
1600 deaths